Brian Albert Castro (born 16 January 1950) is an Australian novelist and essayist.

Biography

Castro was born in Hong Kong and has lived in Australia since 1961. He was Chair of Creative Writing (2008–2019) at the University of Adelaide and Director of the J.M. Coetzee Centre for Creative Practice. His publisher is Giramondo Publishing.

Born in Hong Kong of Portuguese, Chinese and English parentage, Brian Castro was educated at St Joseph's College Hunter's Hill and the University of Sydney, after which he worked in Australia, France and Hong Kong as a teacher and writer. His first novel Birds of Passage (1983) won The Australian/Vogel Literary Award. Double-Wolf (1991) won The Age Fiction Prize, the Vance Palmer Prize and the Innovative Writing Prize at the Victorian Premier's Literary Awards. After China (1992) again won the Victorian Premier's Literary Award. His sixth novel, Stepper (1997), was awarded the National Book Council Prize for Fiction. Shanghai Dancing was published by Giramondo in March 2003, winning the Victorian Premier's Award, the NSW Premier's Award and was named NSW Book of the Year. The Garden Book won the 2006 Queensland Premier's Award and The Bath Fugues was short-listed for the Miles Franklin Award, the South Australian Premier's Literary Award, the Queensland Premier's Fiction Prize and the Victorian Premier's Literary Award. In 2012 he published Street To Street, inspired by the life of the poet Christopher Brennan (Giramondo). His latest novel was Blindness and Rage which won the Prime Minister's Award for Poetry in 2018 (Giramondo, 2017.) He currently lives in the Adelaide Hills.

In 2014 he won the Patrick White Award for Literature for his contribution to Australian Literature.

Awards and nominations

 1982: Australian/Vogel Literary Award for his first novel, Birds of Passage (shared award)
 1991: Victorian Premier's Literary Award Vance Palmer Prize for Fiction, plus the Innovative Writing Award. The Age Book of the Year. Three prizes for his third novel Double-Wolf + Miles Franklin Award (Shortlisted)
 1992: Victorian Premier's Literary Award for After China Miles Franklin Award (Shortlisted)
 1997: National Book Council "Banjo" Award for Stepper
 2004: Victorian Premier's Literary Award for Fiction, and the New South Wales Premier's Literary Awards Christina Stead Fiction Prize and Book of the Year for Shanghai Dancing
 2006: Miles Franklin Award (Shortlisted), and the Queensland Premier's Literary Awards Fiction Book Award for The Garden Book
 2010: Miles Franklin Award (Shortlisted), The Bath Fugues
 2014: Adelaide Festival Awards for Literature (Shortlisted), "Street To Street"
 2014: Patrick White Award for Literature, Contribution to Australian Literature
 2018: Prime Minister's Literary Award for Poetry, "Blindness and Rage"

Bibliography

Novels/Verse Novel
Birds of Passage (1983)
Pomeroy (1990)
Double-Wolf (1991)
After China (1992)
Drift (1994)
Stepper (1997)
Shanghai Dancing (2003)
The Garden Book (2005)
The Bath Fugues (2009)
Street To Street (2012)
Blindness and Rage (2017)

Non-fiction
(Monograph) Writing Asia: two lectures (1995)
Looking for Estrellita: Essays on Culture and Writing (1999)

Poetry
 Macau Days (with John Young) (2017)

References

External links
[http://cordite.org.au/chapbooks-features/600-lines-of-blindness-rage/ '600 Lines of Blindness & Rage'''], by Brian Castro, Cordite Poetry Review''
Brian Castro at Lythrumpress.com.au
Brian Castro at Giramondo Publishing
OzArts – Brian Castro
 Bernadette Brennan 'Unpacking Castro's Library, or Detours and Return in The Garden Book ' JASAL Special Issue 2007
 Bernadette Brennan Brian Castro's Fiction: The Seductive Play of Language Cambria Press, 2008

1950 births
Living people
20th-century Australian novelists
20th-century Australian male writers
21st-century Australian novelists
Australian male novelists
Australian non-fiction writers
Australian people of English descent
Australian people of Chinese descent
People educated at St Joseph's College, Hunters Hill
21st-century Australian male writers
Male non-fiction writers
People educated at Oakhill College